Nedo Pinori (born 6 June 1961) is an Italian racing cyclist. He rode in the 1983 Tour de France.

References

1961 births
Living people
Italian male cyclists
Place of birth missing (living people)